The 950s BC is a decade which lasted from 959 BC to 950 BC.

Events and trends
 959 BC—Psusennes II succeeds Siamun as king of Egypt.
 957 BC–Solomon's Temple is completed. 959 BC is also a proposed date. 
 957 BC—The reign of Mu Wang of the Zhou Dynasty begins.
 952 BC—Thersippus, King of Athens dies after a reign of 41 years and is succeeded by his son Phorbas.
 950 BC—Northern Egypt starts to be ruled by Libyan pharaohs. The Libyans build cities and for the first time a sturdy urban life grows up in the Nile Delta.
 c. 950 BC–800 BC—Some early parts of the Bible are written.
 c. 950 BC Kurukshetra War

Births
 Osorkon I, pharaoh of Egypt, is born (approximate date).
King Parikshit of Kuru Dynasty is born.

Deaths
King Zhao of Zhou, drowned in 957 BC

References